Basem is an Arabic male given name. Notable people with this name include:

 Basem Al-Montashari (born 1990), Saudi Arabian football player
 Basem Al-Sherif (born 1984), Saudi football player
 Basem Ali (born 1988), Egyptian football player
 Basem Atallah (born 1989), Saudi Arabian football player
 Basem Darwisch (born 1966), Egyptian–German composer, producer and oud virtuoso
 Basem Eid (born 1990), Egyptian football player
 Basem Eltahhan (born 1982), Egyptian snooker player
 Basem Fathi (born 1982), Jordanian football player
 Basem Khandakji, Palestinian journalist and prisoner
 Basem Morsy (born 1992), Egyptian football player
 Basem Naim (born 1963), Palestinian politician